This is a list of high schools in the state of Montana.

As of 2016, the enrollment criteria for each class is: 779 and up for Class AA, 307-778 for Class A, 108-306 for Class B and 1-107 for Class C.

Beaverhead County
Beaverhead County High School, Dillon, Class A
Lima High School, Lima Class C

Big Horn County
Hardin High School, Hardin, Class A
Lodge Grass High School, Lodge Grass, Class B
Northern Cheyenne High School, Busby, Class C
Northern Cheyenne Tribal School, Busby  [Non Affiliated with MHSA - no classification]
Plenty Coups High School, Pryor, Class C

Blaine County
Chinook High School, Chinook, Class C
Harlem High School, Harlem, Class B
Hays-Lodge Pole High School, Hays, Class C
Turner High School, Turner, Class C

Broadwater County
Broadwater High School, Townsend, Class B

Carbon County
Belfry High School, Belfry, Class C
Bridger High School, Bridger, Class C
Fromberg High School, Fromberg, Class C
Joliet High School, Joliet, Class B
Red Lodge High School, Red Lodge, Class B
Roberts High School, Roberts, Class C

Carter County
Carter County High School, Ekalaka, Class C

Cascade County
Belt High School, Belt, Class C
Cascade High School, Cascade, Class C
Centerville High School, Centerville, Class C
Charles M. Russell High School (CMR), Great Falls, Class AA
Great Falls Central Catholic High School, Great Falls, Class B
Great Falls High School, Great Falls, Class AA
Montana School for Deaf & Blind High, Great Falls, Class C
Simms High School, Simms, Class C

Chouteau County
Big Sandy High School, Big Sandy, Class C
Fort Benton High School, Fort Benton, Class C
Geraldine High School, Geraldine, Class C
Highwood High School, Highwood, Class C

Custer County
Custer County High School, Miles City, Class A

Daniels County
Scobey High School, Scobey, Class C

Dawson County
Dawson High School, Glendive, Class A
Richey High School, Richey, Class C

Deer Lodge County
Anaconda High School, Anaconda, Class B

Fallon County
Baker High School, Baker, Class B
Plevna High School, Plevna, Class C

Fergus County
Denton High School, Denton, Class C
Fergus County High School, Lewistown, Class A
Grass Range High School, Grass Range, Class C
Moore High School, Moore, Class C
Roy High School, Roy, Class C
Winifred High School, Winifred, Class C

Flathead County
Bigfork High School, Bigfork, Class B
Columbia Falls High School, Columbia Falls, Class A
Flathead High School, Kalispell, Class AA
Glacier High School, Kalispell, Class AA
Stillwater Christian School, Kalispell, [Non Affiliated with MHSA - no classification]
Whitefish High School, Whitefish, Class A

Gallatin County
Belgrade High School, Belgrade, Class AA
Bozeman High School, Bozeman, Class AA
Gallatin High School, Bozeman, Class AA
Heritage Christian School, Bozeman [Non affiliated with MHSA - no classification]
Lone Peak High School, Big Sky, Montana, Class C
Manhattan Christian School, Churchill, Class C
Manhattan High School, Manhattan, Class B
Mount Ellis Academy, Bozeman, [Non affiliated with MHSA - no classification]
Three Forks High School, Three Forks, Class B
West Yellowstone High School, West Yellowstone, Class C
Willow Creek High School, Willow Creek, Class C

Garfield County
Garfield County District High School, Jordan, Class C

Glacier County
Browning High School, Browning, Class A
Cut Bank High School, Cut Bank, Class B

Golden Valley County
Lavina High School, Lavina, Class C
Ryegate High School, Ryegate, Class C

Granite County
Drummond High School, Drummond, Class C
Granite High School, Philipsburg, Class C

Hill County
Box Elder High School, Box Elder, Class C
Rocky Boy High School, Box Elder, Class B
Havre High School, Havre, Class A
North Star High School, Rudyard, Class C

Jefferson County
Jefferson High School, Boulder, Class B
Whitehall High School, Whitehall, Class B

Judith Basin County
Geyser High School, Geyser, Class C
Hobson High School, Hobson, Class C
Stanford High School, Stanford, Class C

Lake County
Arlee High School, Arlee, Class B
Charlo High School, Charlo, Class C
Two Eagle River School, Pablo, Class C
Polson High School, Polson, Class A
Ronan High School, Ronan, Class A
Mission High School, St. Ignatius, Class B

Lewis and Clark County
Augusta High School, Augusta, Class C
Capital High School, Helena, Class AA
East Helena High School, East Helena, Class A
Helena High School, Helena, Class AA
Lincoln High School, Lincoln, Class C

Liberty County
Chester-Joplin-Inverness High School (CJI), Chester, Class C

Lincoln County
Lincoln County High School, Eureka, Class B
Libby High School, Libby, Class A
Troy High School, Troy, Class C

Madison County
Ennis High School, Ennis, Class C
Harrison High School, Harrison, Class C
Sheridan High School, Sheridan, Class C
Twin Bridges High School, Twin Bridges, Class C

McCone County
Circle High School, Circle, Class C

Meagher County
White Sulphur Springs High School, White Sulphur Springs, Class C

Mineral County
Alberton High School, Alberton, Class C
St. Regis High School, St. Regis, Class C
Superior High School, Superior, Class C

Missoula County
Big Sky High School, Missoula, Class AA
Frenchtown High School, Frenchtown, Class A
Hellgate High School, Missoula, Class AA
Loyola Sacred Heart High School, Missoula, Class B
 Missoula International School, Missoula
Seeley-Swan High School, Seeley Lake, Class C
Sentinel High School, Missoula, Class AA
Valley Christian School, Missoula, Class C
 Willard Alternative High School, Missoula

Musselshell County
Melstone High School, Melstone, Class C
Roundup High School, Roundup, Class B

Park County
Gardiner High School, Gardiner, Class C
Park High School, Livingston, Class A
Shields Valley High School, Clyde Park, Class C

Petroleum County
Winnett High School, Winnett, Class C

Phillips County
Dodson High School, Dodson, Class C
Malta High School, Malta, Class B
Saco High School, Saco, Class C
Whitewater High School, Whitewater, Class C

Pondera County
Conrad High School, Conrad, Class B
Heart Butte High School, Heart Butte, Class C
Valier High School, Valier, Class C

Powder River County
Powder River County District High School, Broadus, Class C

Powell County
Powell County High School, Deer Lodge, Class B

Prairie County
Terry High School, Terry, Class C

Ravalli County
Corvallis High School, Corvallis, Class A
Darby High School, Darby, Class C
Florence-Carlton High School, Florence, Class B
Hamilton High School, Hamilton, Class A
Stevensville High School, Stevensville, Class A
Victor High School, Victor, Class C

Richland County
Fairview High School, Fairview, Class C
Lambert High School, Lambert, Class C
Savage High School, Savage, Class C
Sidney High School, Sidney, Class A

Roosevelt County
Bainville High School, Bainville, Class C
Brockton High School, Brockton, Class C
Culbertson High School, Culbertson, Class C
Froid High School, Froid, Class C
Poplar High School, Poplar, Class B
Wolf Point High School, Wolf Point, Class B

Rosebud County
Colstrip High School, Colstrip, Class B
Forsyth High School, Forsyth, Class C
Lame Deer High School, Lame Deer, Class B
Rosebud High School, Rosebud, Class C
St. Labre Indian Catholic High School, Ashland, Class B

Sanders County
Hot Springs High School, Hot Springs, Class C
Noxon High School, Noxon, Class C
Plains High School, Plains, Class C
Thompson Falls High School, Thompson Falls, Class B

Sheridan County
Medicine Lake High School, Medicine Lake, Class C
Plentywood High School, Plentywood, Class C
Westby High School, Westby, Class C

Silver Bow County
Butte Central Catholic High School, Butte, Class A
Butte High School, Butte, Class AA

Stillwater County
Absarokee High School, Absarokee, Class C
Columbus High School, Columbus, Class B
Park City High School, Park City, Class C
Rapelje High School, Rapelje, Class C
Reed Point High School, Reed Point, Class C

Sweet Grass County
Sweet Grass County High School, Big Timber, Class B

Teton County
Choteau High School, Choteau, Class B
Dutton/Brady High School, Dutton, Class C
Fairfield High School, Fairfield, Class B
Power High School, Power, Class C

Toole County
North Toole County High School, Sunburst, Class C
Shelby High School, Shelby, Class B

Treasure County
Hysham High School, Hysham, Class C

Valley County
Frazer High School, Frazer, Class C
Lustre Christian High School, Lustre, Class C
Glasgow High School, Glasgow, Class B
Hinsdale High School, Hinsdale, Class C
Nashua High School, Nashua, Class C
Opheim High School, Opheim, Class C

Wheatland County
Harlowton High School, Harlowton, Class C
Judith Gap High School, Judith Gap, Class C

Wibaux County
Wibaux High School, Wibaux, Class C

Yellowstone County
Billings Central Catholic High School, Billings, Class A
Billings Senior High School, Billings, Class AA
Billings West High School, Billings, Class AA
Broadview High School, Broadview, Class C
Custer High School, Custer, Class C
Huntley Project High School, Worden, Class B
Laurel High School, Laurel, Class A
Lockwood High School, Lockwood, Class A
Rimrock Christian High School, Billings, [Non affiliated with MHSA - no classification]
Shepherd High School, Shepherd, Class B
Skyview High School, Billings, Class AA
Yellowstone Academy, Billings, [Non affiliated with MHSA - no classification]

References

External links 
List of high schools in Montana from SchoolTree.org
 https://web.archive.org/web/20110521095619/http://mhsa.org/Enrollment/2010-11FallEnrollmentByClassification.pdf

Montana
High schools